Komyshany is an urban-type settlement in Kherson Raion, Kherson Oblast, southern Ukraine. It is essentially a west suburb of the city of Kherson and is located on the right bank of the Dnieper Delta. Komyshany belongs to Kherson urban hromada, one of the hromadas of Ukraine. It has a population of

Administrative status 
Until 18 July, 2020, Komyshany belonged to Kherson Municipality. The municipality as an administrative unit was abolished in July 2020 as part of the administrative reform of Ukraine, which reduced the number of raions of Kherson Oblast to five. The area of Kherson Municipality was merged into Kherson Raion.

Economy

Transportation
The closest railway station is in Kherson. Komyshany is connected by road with Kherson where it has access to the Ukrainian road network.

See also 

 Russian occupation of Kherson Oblast

References

Urban-type settlements in Kherson Raion